is a district of Chiyoda, Tokyo, Japan, consisting of 1-chōme to 4-chōme. As of March 1, 2007, its population is 2,431.

Kudanminami is located on the northwestern part of the Chiyoda ward. The Nihonbashi River and Yasukuni-dōri Ave form its eastern and northern boundaries, respectively. It borders Kanda-Jinbōchō to the east, Gobanchō to the west, Sanbanchō, Hitotsubashi and Yonbanchō to the south, and Kudankita to the north. In addition, it borders Kitanomaru Kōen between its 1-chōme and 2-chōme. The zone is a prestigious business and residential zone.

District

Kudanminami 1-chōme

Kudanminami 1-chōme is situated on the easternmost part of the Kudanminami district. The Nishinomaru Park is situated to the west. This subdistrict is home to a number of office buildings, facilities, and public institutions.
Chiyoda Ward Office
Chiyoda Kaikan
Kudan Kaikan
Kudan Common Government Office Building
Kudan Common Government Office Building No.2 (Tokyo Legal Affairs Bureau)
Kudan Common Government Office Building No.3
Aozora Bank Head Office
Kudan Social Education Center
Kudan Post Office
Japan War-Bereaved Families Association headquarters

Kudanminami 2, 3 and 4 are part of the Banchō area.

Kudanminami 2-chōme
The Nishinomaru Park is situated to the east. Kudanminami 3-chōme is situated to the west.
Embassy of India
Kudanzaka Hospital
High School attached to Nishogakusha University
Branch Government Office of the Ministry of Agriculture, Forestry and Fisheries 
Chidorigafuchi Moat Path

Kudanminami 3-chōme
This subdistrict is situated on the west of Kudanminami.

Kudanminami 4-chōme
This subdistrict is situated on the westernmost part of Kudanminami, bordering its 3-chōme to the east and Gobanchō to the west.
Main branch of Nihon University
Kōjimachi Post Office

Education
 operates public elementary and junior high schools. Fujimi Elementary School (富士見小学校) is the zoned elementary school for Kudanminami 1-chōme while Kudan Elementary School (千代田区立九段小学校) is the zoned elementary school for Kudanminami 2-4 chōme. There is a freedom of choice system for junior high schools in Chiyoda Ward, and so there are no specific junior high school zones.

References

Districts of Chiyoda, Tokyo